General elections were held in Malta between 7 and 9 August 1927. Although the Nationalist Party received the most votes, the Constitutional Party emerged as the largest party, winning 15 of the 32 seats in the Legislative Assembly. The Nationalist Party remained the largest party in the Senate with four of the seven elected seats.

Electoral system
The elections were held using the single transferable vote system, whilst suffrage was limited to men meeting certain property qualifications.

Results

Legislative Assembly

Senate

References

General elections in Malta
Malta
1927 in Malta
August 1927 events
Election and referendum articles with incomplete results
1927 elections in the British Empire